False foxglove may refer to:
 Agalinis, a genus of plants in the family Orobanchaceae
 Aureolaria, another genus of plants in the family Orobanchaceae

See also
 Foxglove (disambiguation)